Qatar Scientific Club is a non-profit organization based in Qatar. It offers training programs, workshops, and activities in a number of scientific fields.

Mission
The organization's mission is to create a suitable atmosphere for the practices of scientific hobbies; encourage scientific activities among the younger population, and increase their interest in the sciences.

Background
The club was established in 1987 under a decree which was issued by the vice chairman of Qatar Youth Welfare higher council as a response to a request which was submitted by twenty-five members. Initially, the club only had two sections which were Electronics and Electricity, however, the number of sections increased as the club members number was growing.

Departments and sections
The club consists of a number of departments including astronomy, aviation, engineering and others. There is a dedicated Young Scientists department where children can join and participate in different scientific experiments and activities. Due to cultural reasons, female members have a separate department which is called "Scientific Girl Club" and it runs its activities separately from the other main departments; however there is collaboration between these departments.

Community initiatives
In 2008, the club launched the "Green Computer" project in association with Microsoft. The project sought to recycle outdated and discarded computers from companies and homes so that they can be re-used by peoples of lower income. In 2012, the project received funding by the Commercial Bank of Qatar in the form of a QR200,000 grant, in addition to receiving funding from Microsoft. The project also began extending its operations to other countries the same year.

The QSC conducted a joint-venture with Qatar Science & Technology Park when it co-hosted the "Future Scientist Summer Camp 2010". The main aim of the camp was to explain scientific and technological themes to a predicted 1,000 children between the ages of 6 to 16. It featured interactive exhibits and workshops.

References

External links
 Official website

Scientific organisations based in Qatar
Clubs and societies in Qatar
Organisations based in Doha
Non-profit organisations based in Qatar
Scientific organizations established in 1987
1987 establishments in Qatar